W is the twenty-third letter of the Latin alphabet.

W may also refer to:

Arts and entertainment

Books and magazines
 W (magazine), an American fashion magazine
 W, or the Memory of Childhood, a 1975 novel by Georges Perec
 W Publishing, formerly Word Publishing, an imprint of Thomas Nelson
 "W" Is for Wasted, the twenty-third novel in Sue Grafton's "Alphabet mystery" series, published in 2013

Film and television
 W (1974 film), a suspense American film
 W (2014 film), a thriller Hindi language film
 W. (film), a 2008 film about United States President George W. Bush by Oliver Stone
 W (TV series), a 2016 South Korean television series
 Kamen Rider W, a 2009–10 Japanese tokusatsu drama
W, the production code for the 1966 Doctor Who serial The Massacre of St Bartholomew's Eve

Music
 Wumpscut, an electro-industrial music project sometimes referred to as :w:
 W (group), a Japanese pop music duo
 The W, a studio album by the Wu-Tang Clan
 W (Wanessa Camargo album), 2005
 W (Planningtorock album), 2011
 W (Whigfield album), 2012
 "W", a song by Koffee
 W (Boris album), 2022

Broadcasting
 W Network, a Canadian cable television specialty channel
 W Channel (Australia), an Australian pay television channel
 W (British TV channel), a UK and Ireland general entertainment channel
 W, the initial call sign letter for most U.S. radio and television stations east of the Mississippi River

Organizations and businesses
 Mississippi University for Women, US, nickname "The W"
 W Hotels, a brand of hotels of Marriott International
 W Motors, an UAE based sports car company
 Wayfair (NYSE stock symbol: W)
 Women's National Basketball Association, also nicknamed "The W"
 World Balance, a shoe company
Big W, an Australian discount department store, and subsidiary of Woolworths Group

Science and technology
 Watt (W), the SI derived unit for power
 Tungsten, symbol W, a chemical element
 W band, a radio band ranging from 75 to 111 GHz
 Work (physics) (symbol: W), in physics
 Tryptophan (single letter abbreviation: W), an amino acid
 Haplogroup W (mtDNA), a human mitochondrial DNA (mtDNA) haplogroup
 Lambert W function, a set of functions where w is any complex number
 Weierstrass function, a real function continuous everywhere but differentiable nowhere
 W and Z bosons, subatomic particles
 Wurtzite crystal structure (prefix w-)
 Weight (W)
 W state a type of quantum entanglement

Computing
 w (Unix), a command to list logged in users on Unix-like systems
 W Window System, a graphical windowing system for Unix platforms
 Algorithm W, or the Hindley–Milner type inference algorithm

Transportation
 W (Los Angeles Railway), a line operated by the Los Angeles Railway from 1920 to 1956
 W (New York City Subway service), a New York City Subway service
 W (tram), a class of electric trams built by the Melbourne & Metropolitan Tramways Board.

Other uses
 W postcode area, of London
 Five Ws, of journalism: who, what, when, where, and why
 West, one of the four cardinal directions
 Voiced labial-velar approximant [w], in the International Phonetic Alphabet
 George W. Bush (born 1946), 43rd President of the United States, nickname "W"
 Whiskey, the military time zone code for UTC−10:00
 The W emblem on Wario's hat and gloves
 Internet slang for winning

See also

 Win (disambiguation)
 VV (disambiguation)
 UU (disambiguation)
 W. (disambiguation)
 
 W series (disambiguation)